The 19th Saturn Awards, honoring the best in science fiction, fantasy and horror film and television in 1992, were held on June 8, 1993.

Winners and nominees
Below is a complete list of nominees and winners. Winners are highlighted in bold.

Film

Television

Video

Special awards
George Pal Memorial Award
 Frank Marshall

Life Career Award
 David Lynch

President's Award
 Gale Anne Hurd

Service Award
 Alice La Deane

References

External links
 Official Website
 'Dracula' wins big at Saturn Awards
 Past Winners Database – 1992 19th Saturn Awards

Saturn Awards ceremonies
1993 film awards
1993 television awards